Lucia Maria Angela Field (born 2 February 2004) is an Australian dancer and singer. She is a member of The Wiggles, performing as a Blue Wiggle alongside her father, Anthony Field.

References

Australian ballerinas
The Wiggles members
Living people
2004 births
People from Sydney